Florida's Turnpike Enterprise (FTE) is a unit of the Florida Department of Transportation that operates toll roads in Florida.  The current Executive Director is Nicola Liquori.

History
The Florida State Turnpike Authority was authorized by the Florida Legislature and signed into law by Gov. Dan McCarty as the Turnpike Authority Act on June 11, 1953.  The Authority was reorganized and incorporated into the newly formed Florida Department of Transportation (FDOT) in July 1969. The Turnpike’s functions became part of the FDOT pursuant to the reorganization of the State Government Act.  At that time, individual FDOT Districts managed the Turnpike work program, operations, and maintenance in their areas.  In 1988, the Florida Legislature created the Office of Florida's Turnpike.

In 1990, the Legislature passed Senate Bill 1316, authorizing the expansion of Florida's Turnpike to include construction of non-contiguous road projects as an alternative to assist in meeting the state’s backlog of needed highway facilities.  The Legislature set environmental and financial feasibility standards, authorized toll increases on the existing system, and allowed higher rate per mile tolls on the new projects through Chapter 339.2275(3) of the Florida Statutes.  The Legislature approved expansion projects and new interchanges subject to verification of economic feasibility, determination that the projects are consistent, to the maximum extent feasible, with approved local government comprehensive plans were projects are located, and completion of a statement of the project’s significant environmental impacts.  Fifty road projects were submitted for consideration and, ultimately, ten new roads were identified for possible construction, subject to meeting the feasibility requirements, and 15 new interchanges.

On April 11, 2002, Gov. Jeb Bush signed House Bill 261, creating Florida's Turnpike Enterprise, and directing the Turnpike to pursue innovation and best private-sector business practices, to improve cost-effectiveness and timeliness in project delivery, to increase revenues and expand its capital program, and to improve quality of service to its customers.  At that time, the Office of Toll Operations, formerly a separate division of the State of Florida, was folded into the FTE and is exempt from FDOT policies, procedures, and standards, subject to the secretary having the authority to apply any such policies, procedures, and standards to the FTE from time to time as deemed appropriate.

System description
The flagship route of the FTE is Florida's Turnpike along with the Homestead Extension of Florida's Turnpike.  The FTE also operates Polk Parkway (SR 570), Suncoast Parkway (SR 589), Veterans Expressway (SR 589), Sawgrass Expressway (SR 869), the Seminole Expressway and Southern Connector portions of SR 417, the southern  of Daniel Webster Western Beltway (SR 429) and the western eight miles (13 km) of Beachline Expressway (SR 528), known as Beachline West.

The FTE collects tolls on the portion of Interstate 75 known as Alligator Alley, the Sunshine Skyway Bridge, the Pinellas Bayway System and the Beachline East (State Road 528), all FDOT-owned roads and bridges.  It also provides toll collection services for the Garcon Point and Mid-Bay Bridges in Florida's Panhandle.

References

Toll road authorities of the United States
2002 establishments in Florida
Government agencies established in 2002